Elmdale is an unincorporated community in Coal Creek Township, Montgomery County, in the U.S. state of Indiana.

History
Elmdale was originally known under the name Boston Store. The name was later changed to Elmdale, likely due to the abundance of elm trees in the area.

A post office was established under the name Boston Store in 1866, was renamed Elmdale in 1882, and remained in operation until it was discontinued in 1905.

Geography

References

Unincorporated communities in Montgomery County, Indiana
Unincorporated communities in Indiana